Mikhail Youzhny was the defending champion, but lost in the quarterfinals this year.

Thomas Johansson won the title, beating Nicolas Kiefer 6–4, 6–2 in the final.

Seeds

Draw

Finals

Top half

Bottom half

References

 Main Draw
 Qualifying Draw

St. Petersburg Open
2005 ATP Tour
2005 in Russian tennis